Susan M. Domchek is an oncologist at the University of Pennsylvania, Executive Director of the Basser Center for BRCA, the Basser Professor in Oncology at the Perelman School of Medicine, and Director of the Mariann and Robert MacDonald Cancer Risk Evaluation Program at Penn Medicine. She has authored more than 250 articles in scholarly journals and serves on a number of editorial review boards. In 2018, Domchek was elected to the National Academy of Medicine.

Career
Dr. Domchek's work focuses on the genetic evaluation and medical management of individuals with inherited risk factors for cancer. Dr. Domchek is particularly interested in developing new cancer therapies, such as PARP inhibitors for breast cancer due to genetic risk factors. In 2011, she led the organization of the international team of physician scientists known as BRCA-TAC, which led a charge to advance clinical testing of olaparib in cancer patients with known inherited mutations in BRCA1 and BRCA2. Cancers that are associated with BRCA1 and BRCA2 include breast cancer in men and women, ovarian cancer, melanoma, prostate and pancreatic cancer.

In 2012, Domchek was named Executive Director of the Basser Center for BRCA at Penn Medicine's Abramson Cancer Center, the first comprehensive center for the research, treatment, and prevention of BRCA-related cancers. In 2015, Domchek was awarded the William Osler Patient Oriented Research Award for her clinical research in breast cancer genetics. In 2018, Domchek was elected to the National Academy of Medicine and was honored with the 2018 Spirit of Empowerment by the non-profit organization Facing Our Risk of Cancer Empowered.

Domchek is a significant contributor to the oncology literature and has authored/co-authored more than 350 articles appearing in scholarly journals including the New England Journal of Medicine, the Journal of the American Medical Association, and the Journal of Clinical Oncology. An elected member of the National Academy of Medicine, the American Society of Clinical Investigation, and the Association of American Physicians, Dr. Domchek is also a Fellow of the American Society of Clinical Oncology (FASCO), a recognition bestowed upon ASCO members who have shown extraordinary dedication for their voluntary efforts that benefit the Society, the specialty of oncology, and most importantly to her patients. She serves on a number of editorial review boards. including the Journal of Clinical Oncology, as well as on the Scientific Advisory Board for the Breast Cancer Research Foundation and FORCE.

References

Living people
American oncologists
Women oncologists
American women scientists
University of Pennsylvania faculty
Year of birth missing (living people)
American women academics
21st-century American women
Members of the National Academy of Medicine